The 2019 American Athletic Conference men's basketball tournament was the postseason men's basketball tournament for the American Athletic Conference. It was held March 14 through March 17, 2019, at the FedEx Forum in Memphis, Tennessee. Cincinnati defeated Houston 69–57 in the championship to earn the American Athletic Conference's automatic bid to the NCAA tournament. It was the second consecutive tournament championship for Cincinnati.

Seeds
All 12 conference teams will participate in the conference tournament. The top four teams receive a bye into the quarterfinals. Teams are seeded by record within the conference, with a tiebreaker system to seed teams with identical conference records. Tiebreakers: win–loss record, head-to-head record, record against the highest ranked team outside of the tied teams, record against the second highest ranked team outside of the tied teams, etc.

Schedule

Bracket

References

American Athletic Conference men's basketball tournament
2018–19 American Athletic Conference men's basketball season
Basketball competitions in Memphis, Tennessee
2019 in sports in Tennessee
College basketball tournaments in Tennessee